Staliyska mahala is a village in northwestern Bulgaria, with a population of around 1,300.
It is located in the Lom Municipality of the Montana Province. It has a train stop on the Brusartsi - Lom railway.

See also
List of villages in Montana Province

Villages in Montana Province